Thomas Edward Manley Chew (August 11, 1874 – December 17, 1928) was a lumber merchant and political figure in Ontario, Canada. He represented Simcoe East in the House of Commons of Canada from 1908 to 1911 and from 1921 to 1925 as a Liberal.

He was born in Rugby, Ontario as the son of George Chew and Sophia Lawrence, and was educated in Midland and Toronto. He lived in Midland. In 1900, he married Effie Mae Ann Williams. Chew was defeated when he ran for re-election in 1911, 1917 and 1925. He died in Preston Springs at the age of 54.

References

Members of the House of Commons of Canada from Ontario
Liberal Party of Canada MPs
1874 births
1928 deaths